This is a list of town tramway systems in Japan, past and present, by region. Regions and towns are arranged in geographic order, northeast to southwest.

Hokkaidō

Tōhoku region

Kantō region

Tokyo

Chūbu region

Kansai region

Chūgoku region

Shikoku

Kyūshū

Okinawa Prefecture

See also
List of town tramway systems
List of light-rail transit systems
List of rapid transit systems
List of trolleybus systems

References

Other reference sources
 和久田康雄 Wakuda, Yasuo. 1993. 私鉄史ハンドブック Shitetsu shi handbook (Private Railways of Japan, Their Networks and Fleets, 1882 to 1991). Tokyo: Denkisha-kenkyūkai.

Tramways
Japan